Philippe Cochet (born 23 May 1961 in Lyon, Rhône) is a French politician.

He has been a member of the French National Assembly since 2002, most recently re-elected in 2007 for the Rhône department. He is a member of the mainstream conservative party, the UMP.

He is a member of the National Assembly Committee on foreign relations, and the President of the France-Iran Parliamentary Committee.

Within the UMP, Philippe Cochet is part of the libertarian faction called The Reformers. He has been one of the 21 members of the UMP National Committee (Comité directeur) since July 2007.

He is also, since March 2008, the mayor of Caluire-et-Cuire, a city in the Northern suburbs of Lyon.

References

External links
 Official website (fr)

1961 births
Living people
Politicians from Lyon
Union for French Democracy politicians
Liberal Democracy (France) politicians
Union for a Popular Movement politicians
The Republicans (France) politicians
Deputies of the 12th National Assembly of the French Fifth Republic
Deputies of the 13th National Assembly of the French Fifth Republic
Deputies of the 14th National Assembly of the French Fifth Republic
Mayors of places in Auvergne-Rhône-Alpes
Members of Parliament for Rhône